Coelioxys, common name leaf-cutting cuckoo bees or sharp-tailed bees , is a genus of solitary kleptoparasitic or brood parasitic bees, belonging to the family Megachilidae.

Diversity 
The genus includes about 500 species in 15 subgenera.

Selected species 
 Coelioxys angulata
 Coelioxys apicata
 Coelioxys capitata
 Coelioxys fenestrata
 Coelioxys formosicola
 Coelioxys fuscipennis
 Coelioxys minuta
 Coelioxys nitidoscutellaris
 Coelioxys rufitarsis
 Coelioxys sodalis

For a complete list, see List of Coelioxys species.

Distribution 
Coelioxys species can be found in most European countries, in the Afrotropical realm, in the East Palearctic realm, in North Africa, in the Nearctic and Neotropics.

Description 
They show a broad head with large complex eyes and broad thorax and abdomen. Their body is only moderately hairy. They are usually black with white hair stripes. Legs maybe red or black. The females of Coelioxys species have a long pointed abdomen that resembles a cone, used to pierce the leaf lining in the laying of eggs. The male's abdomen is armed with spines or teeth.

They are known to sometimes sleep upside down on vegetation.

Biology
These cuckoo bees are usually active from June to September, depending on the specific host species. They have no pollen-carrying adaptations, as they do not need to provision nests. Adults feed on nectar at flowers of a wide range of different nectar plants. In fact they mainly lay their eggs in the nests of bees in the genus Megachile, but also in the nests of Osmia and Anthophora, on their provisions of pollen.   As this behavior is similar to that of cuckoos, such bees are sometimes referred to as "cuckoo bees".  These host-parasite relationships are quite complex. The larvae of Coelioxys species kill the host larvae with their strongly developed mandibles and feed on the host's pollen provisions. They spin a cocoon at 11–16 days. These species are usually univoltine, but for some species a second generation is possible.

Gallery

References 

 Baker, J. R. 1975. Taxonomy of five nearctic subgenera of Coelioxys (Hymenoptera: Megachilidae). University of Kansas Science Bulletin 50: 649–730.

External links 
 Wildbienen

 
Brood parasites
Bee genera
Articles containing video clips